Georgia O'Keeffe is a 2009 American television biographical drama film, produced by City Entertainment in association with Sony Television, about noted American painter Georgia O'Keeffe and her husband, photographer Alfred Stieglitz. The film was directed by Bob Balaban, executive-produced by Joshua D. Maurer, Alixandre Witlin and Joan Allen, and line-produced by Tony Mark. Shown on Lifetime Television, it starred Joan Allen and Jeremy Irons in lead roles.

At the 2010 Primetime Emmy Awards, the film received nine nominations, including Outstanding Made for Television Movie and Outstanding Lead Actor in a Miniseries or Movie for Jeremy Irons and Outstanding Lead Actress in a Miniseries or a Movie for Joan Allen. The film was also nominated for three 2009 Golden Globe Awards, including Best Miniseries or Television Movie or Miniseries, as well as receiving nominations for director by the Directors Guild of America and a Producers Guild nomination for Producer of the Year award for Outstanding Television Movie or Miniseries, and a NAACP nomination for supporting actor in a Television Movie or Miniseries. The movie earned more total nominations than in the history of Lifetime Television combined, making it the most critically acclaimed film in Lifetime's history.

Plot
Georgia O'Keeffe (Joan Allen) is a young painter in the 1910s, while Alfred Stieglitz (Jeremy Irons) is New York-based photographer and art impresario, who discovers her works. Later, when O'Keeffe discovers that her works are displayed at an art gallery without her permission, she confronts Stieglitz. However, he manages to charm her, and starts their 20-year relationship. Stieglitz, 23 years senior to O'Keeffe, subsequently starts living with her and later divorces his wife to marry her. However, over the years, as O'Keeffe becomes a famous artist, their relationship deteriorates.

Cast
 Joan Allen as Georgia O'Keeffe
 Jeremy Irons as Alfred Stieglitz
 Henry Simmons as Jean Toomer
 Ed Begley, Jr. as Stieglitz's brother Lee
 Tyne Daly as Mabel Dodge Luhan
 Kathleen Chalfant as Mrs. Stieglitz
 Linda Emond as Beck Strand
 Jenny Gabrielle as Dorothy Norman
 Chad Brummett as Marsden Hartley
 Steve Corona as John Marin

Production

Development and writing

The film was in development for four years at HBO, having been originally pitched and developed by executive producers Maurer, Witlin and Allen, and at one point it was to be produced by HBO, but eventually Lifetime took it up once HBO passed.

The film's screenplay, which was nominated and won the 2009 Writers Guild Award for Best Original Screenplay for Movie or Miniseries, was written by Pulitzer Prize winner Michael Cristofer, most known for Pulitzer Prize-winning play The Shadow Box (1977) and the 1998 film Gia .

Filming
The film was shot entirely on location in and around Santa Fe, New Mexico. The executive producers worked closely with the Georgia O'Keeffe Museum, specifically with curator and leading scholar on O'Keeffe, Barbara Buhler Lynes, to make sure issues of accuracy and content were done with sensitivity and attention to detail. Over seventy original paintings and drawings by O'Keeffe were permitted to be used in the film. Moreover, the filmmakers were given permission to film at O'Keeffe's home in Ghost Ranch, near of Abiquiú, New Mexico, the first time a film company was given that privilege. Joan Allen also took painting lessons for the film.

Awards and nominations

References

External links
 Official movie website
 
 

2009 television films
2009 films
2009 biographical drama films
American biographical drama films
Biographical films about artists
Biographical films about painters
Biographical television films
American drama television films
Films directed by Bob Balaban
Films scored by Jeff Beal
Films shot in New Mexico
Films with screenplays by Michael Cristofer
Georgia O'Keeffe
Lifetime (TV network) films
2000s American films